Beau Allred (born 4 June 1965) is a former Major League Baseball outfielder who played in parts of three seasons for the Cleveland Indians between 1989 and 1991. His number from 1989-1990 was #55

College and minor leagues
Allred played collegiately at Lamar University. As a freshman, he had a batting average of .350, 16 home runs, and 44 RBIs. After the season, he was drafted by the Cleveland Indians in the 25th round of the 1987 MLB draft. He spent the 1987 season with the Burlington Indians, where he hit .341 in 54 games. The following season, he was promoted to the Kinston Indians, and had a .252 batting average in 126 games. The next year, Allred played primarily for the Canton–Akron Indians and hit .303 for the team in 118 games. He was then promoted to the Colorado Springs Sky Sox, and played in 11 games for them before being called up to the majors in September.

Professional career
Throughout his three-season career, Allred split time between the Indians and minor leagues. He made his major league debut on 7 September 1989. He played three seasons for the Cleveland Indians between 1989 and 1991. In 1989 he played in 13 games, in 1990 he played in four games, and in 1991 in played in 48 games. In his career, Allred had a batting average of .230 with four home runs and 15 RBIs. He was immortalized in a 1991 article in Sports Illustrated where writer Steve Rushin revealed several pen-written lines of graffiti in a Cleveland Stadium bathroom chronicling Allred's career: "Shoeless Beau Allred", "Clueless Beau Allred" and finally "Clubless Beau Allred".

References

External links

1965 births
Living people
Major League Baseball outfielders
Cleveland Indians players
Kinston Indians players
Baseball players from Arizona
Canton-Akron Indians players
Charlotte Knights players
Colorado Springs Sky Sox players
Richmond Braves players
Lamar Cardinals baseball players
Cochise Apaches baseball players